Nandi Hills may refer to:

 Nandi Hills, Karnataka, India
 Nandi Hills, Kenya